Love Bug is the second album by American organist Reuben Wilson recorded in 1969 and released on the Blue Note label. The CD reissue added one bonus track.

Reception
The Allmusic review by Stephen Thomas Erlewine awarded the album 4 stars and stated "Love Bug was an attempt to establish Reuben Wilson as an organist with either the vision of Larry Young or the fiery style of John Patton, and while it comes up short on both accounts, it nevertheless remains quite enjoyable".

Track listing
All compositions by Reuben Wilson except as noted
 "Hot Rod" - 6:26
 "I'm Gonna Make You Love Me" (Kenneth Gamble, Leon Huff, Jerry Ross) - 5:32
 "I Say a Little Prayer" (Bacharach, David) - 8:10
 "Love Bug" - 8:11
 "Stormy" (Buddy Buie, J.R. Cobb) - 5:46
 "Back Out" - 8:12
 "Hold On, I'm Comin'" (Isaac Hayes, Porter) - 7:57 Bonus track on CD reissue

Personnel
Reuben Wilson - organ
Lee Morgan - trumpet
George Coleman - tenor saxophone
Grant Green - guitar
Leo Morris - drums

References

Blue Note Records albums
Reuben Wilson albums
1969 albums
Albums recorded at Van Gelder Studio
Albums produced by Francis Wolff